James Carlyle "Carl" Long (born September 20, 1967) is an American professional stock car racing driver, mechanic, and team owner. He last competed part-time in the NASCAR Xfinity Series, driving the No. 66 Toyota Supra for MBM Motorsports. In the past, he served as a mechanic for Mansion Motorsports, Spears Motorsports, and Travis Carter Motorsports. He was a crew chief at Front Row Motorsports for Eric McClure and Competition director at Rick Ware Racing.

Early career
Long began racing in 1983 at Orange County and South Boston Speedway. He won the track championship at South Boston in 1987 and the Street Stock championship at Orange County in 1990. In 1992, he raced in NASCAR-sanctioned competition for the first time, earning Rookie of the Year honors at Orange County in the Winston Racing Series, and was awarded the Best Sportsmanship award the following season. After competing at various Winston Racing tracks in the 90's, he moved up to the Slim Jim All Pro Series in 1997, grabbing a win at Bristol Motor Speedway in the No. 15 Austin Foods Chevy.
In 1998, he began running ARCA and Craftsman Truck races for Mansion Motorsports. Most recently, he won the championship race at Orange County Speedway on November 12, 2006.

NASCAR career

1999–2002
Long made his NASCAR debut in 1998 in the Craftsman Truck Series. at Bristol, starting 21st but finishing 31st after the engine in his No. 91 Mansion Motorsports Ford F-150 expired.

He began running the Cup races in 1999 with the No. 85 Mansion Motorsports team, but DNQ'd for every attempt throughout that year. He ran Bristol again the following year, in the Truck Series posting a career-best ninth place qualifying effort, as well as at Louisville Speedway, where he wrecked very early in the race. After more struggles in 2000, he finally qualified to make his Cup Series debut in one of its most prestigious races, the Coca-Cola 600. However, Darrell Waltrip, one of the top drivers in series history, who was retiring at the end of the 2000 season, failed to qualify. Long gave up his ride to Waltrip for the race. He made another truck race in 2000 at Texas, where he started 33rd but finished 17th in a truck fielded by Team 23 Racing. Long would eventually make his Cup debut at Dover, qualifying 42nd but finishing 41st after a crash on lap 12. He made one more start that year, at Rockingham Speedway, finishing 32nd. He ran three races in 2001, his best finish being a 29th at the UAW-GM Quality 500. He also made his Busch Series debut in 2001 in the Aaron's 312 at Atlanta. Driving the No. 49 for Jay Robinson Racing, Carl started 41st but came across handling problems during the race, relegating him to 42nd.

In 2002, Long ran for Rookie of the Year, but failed to earn the award mainly due to an incomplete season. Long attempted a group of the races, but failed to qualify for all except two. He started the season with Mansion Motorsports again, but when that team ran out of money, Long departed the team, originally to Glenn Racing, then to Ware Racing Enterprises, and then finally the No. 59 Foster Price team, with whom he finished 39th at Atlanta Motor Speedway. In addition, he had a sixteenth-place start at Dover for Mansion in the Truck Series (during which Long ran in the Top 10 before an engine failure), and a 30th-place finish at Richmond for Rick Ware in the Revival Soy truck.

2003–2014

He made two Busch races in 2003 for Robert Creech, his best finish a 28th at Rockingham. He had another 28th at Rockingham the following year, as well as running the No. 07 for Moy Racing at Loudon, where his engine expired early in the race. He also ran another race for Ware at New Hampshire, but finished last. He made his first race as a team owner that season, when Matt Carter drove his No. 96 truck to a 17th-place finish at Martinsville Speedway. After failing to make a Cup race in 2003, Long returned to the Glenn Racing Dodge in 2004. In their first race together, Long's car flipped several times in a violent accident at the Subway 400, the final Cup race ever held at North Carolina Speedway in Rockingham, North Carolina. Long was uninjured and returned to the series in the following Cup event at Las Vegas Motor Speedway, driving for fellow independent Hermie Sadler. Long then drove at Pocono Raceway for the McGlynn Racing operation, finishing 41st. After a final race for Glenn he ran two races with Hover Motorsports.

Long announced he would merge his No. 46 team with the McGlynn Racing team to run in 2005. Although he drove only the No. 00 from McGlynn, Long ran nine races that year, and had a career-best qualifying effort of 20th at Atlanta. Unfortunately, sponsors wanted 1990 Daytona 500 winner Derrike Cope to drive the car, which forced McGlynn to release Long. Long closed out the year running at Homestead-Miami Speedway in a personally owned chassis originally purchased from Petty Enterprises. The car was prepared in Stan Hover's shop with mostly volunteers, and a leased motor from Bill Davis Racing was dropped into the car. Unfortunately, a crash in qualifying ended his weekend prematurely. That season Long was also announced as a driver for a new team, Victory Motorsports, owned by Terance Mathis, but the team never ran.

In 2006, Long ran the No. 80 for Hover Motorsports at the Daytona 500, but missed the race. He attempted three races for R&J Racing but also failed to qualify for those events. He returned to the Busch Series, driving the No. 23 for Keith Coleman Racing in six races before being replaced, and also ran a Truck Series race for Jim Rosenblum Racing. He attempted a race at Bristol with Long Brothers Racing, but did not qualify. Long joined a new Nextel Cup team, Cupp Motorsports, in the No. 46 Millstar Tools-sponsored Dodge. Long attempted three races for Cupp, but failed to qualify for each of them. He returned with help from McGlynn to attempt the Ford 400 at the end of 2006, but did not make the race.

In 2007, Long ran a limited schedule for Long Brothers Racing in the USAR Hooters Pro Cup Series, posting a best finish of second. He ran two races for Carter 2 Motorsports in the Busch Series, before the team closed down. He attempted the 2008 Daytona 500 for E&M Motorsports with sponsorship from Millstar and Rhino's Energy Drink, but did not qualify. He began fielding his own car with Red Line Oil sponsoring in the Nationwide Series, making his first start of the season at Darlington Raceway.

Long attempted the 2009 Daytona 500 with sponsorship from Romeo Guest Construction, one of Long's first sponsors in the mid-1990s when he was competing in Late Models.

In May 2009, Long was fined $200,000 after his engine was discovered to be 0.17 cubic inches over the regulation size during practice for the Sprint Showdown. It was the largest fine in NASCAR history until 2013, when Michael Waltrip Racing was fined $300,000 for allegedly manipulating the outcome of the Federated Auto Parts 400. In addition to the fine, Long's team was penalized 200 driver and 200 owner points, suspended for 12 Cup races, suspended from all NASCAR races until August 18, and placed on probation until December 31. Because Long was unable to pay the fine, he was barred from participating in the Cup series. Prior to his suspension, he was a crew member on the No. 34 Front Row Motorsports Cup team. He has driven for numerous independent teams in the Sprint Cup, Nationwide Series, and Camping World Truck Series, as well as the Auto Racing Club of America. In 2010, Long was named to drive the No. 01 Chevrolet for Daisy Ramirez's Truck Series team and the No. 68 Nationwide Series car for Fleur-de-lis Motorsports. For 2011, he drove for Rick Ware Racing in the Nationwide Series.

In 2014, Long partnered with Derek White to form Motorsports Business Management, fielding a team in the Nationwide Series under the name MBM Motorsports. The team made its debut at Bristol with Matt Carter as driver of the No. 13. For six more races in 2014, Long fielded rides for himself, White, and Mike Wallace, failing to qualify for four and not finishing all six races they had qualified.

2017–present
In May 2017, Long announced he had reached an agreement with NASCAR to allow him to return to the Cup Series garage. He also declared his intention to field the No. 66 Chevrolet SS at the Go Bowling 400 in Kansas under the MBM Motorsports banner. The number was selected as tribute to MBM driver Mark Thompson, while the paint scheme was nearly identical to the No. 46 car Long drove in the Cup Series prior to his ban from the Cup garage in 2009; the green and yellow colors remained, though the red roof number was changed to yellow. Although the team received sponsorship from marijuana vaping manufacturer Veedverks, NASCAR prevented the company from appearing on the car after Long misspelled the company name in his sponsor submission to NASCAR, spelling it with an "o" instead of a "d"; upon further investigation by NASCAR, the sanctioning body ordered Long to remove the sponsorship. Long missed the first practice session before running 14 laps in the second session, followed by being unable to set a qualifying lap as he was one of 11 cars stuck in inspection during the session. This relegated Long to a 40th-place starting spot, from which he finished 31st.

Since 2014, Long has owned MBM Motorsports.  The team competes full time in the NASCAR Xfinity Series and part-time in the NASCAR Cup Series.

In February 2021, Long called Noah Gragson an "over-entitled mouthpiece who did not have the talent to avoid the wreck." This was in response to Gragson calling his driver, David Starr, a "dipshit" after Gragson ran into him after Starr blew a tire. Following the season finale weekend at Phoenix, Long, Starr, and seven team members tested positive for COVID-19.

Long is seen as a 'working man's' driver who never had the family corporate money that many of today's stars in racing have behind them.

Personal life
Long was a former manager at a Raleigh/Durham Domino's Pizza, where he was named manager of the year in 1988. Additionally, he holds the record for most pizzas delivered in one night at that location.

Motorsports career results

NASCAR
(key) (Bold – Pole position awarded by qualifying time. Italics – Pole position earned by points standings or practice time. * – Most laps led.)

Monster Energy Cup Series

Daytona 500

Xfinity Series

Camping World Truck Series

 Season still in progress
 Ineligible for series points

ARCA Re/Max Series
(key) (Bold – Pole position awarded by qualifying time. Italics – Pole position earned by points standings or practice time. * – Most laps led.)

 Season still in progress
 Ineligible for series points

References

External links

 
 
 
 

Living people
1967 births
People from Roxboro, North Carolina
Racing drivers from North Carolina
NASCAR drivers
ARCA Menards Series drivers
CARS Tour drivers
NASCAR team owners
Mechanics (people)